Pietro Balistreri (born 14 January 1986, in Palermo) is an Italian football player currently playing for ASD Don Carlo Misilmeri of Eccellenza.

Career
A Palermo youth product, he played two Serie A games for the Rosanero during the 2004–05 season. He successively moved to Serie C1's Pisa in 2005 and spent his entire career playing for several teams in the lower divisions of Italian football.

References

External links
 
 

1986 births
Living people
Italian footballers
Serie A players
Palermo F.C. players
Pisa S.C. players
S.S.D. Città di Gela players
S.S. Monopoli 1966 players
U.S. Cremonese players
Ternana Calcio players
A.S. Melfi players
A.C. Perugia Calcio players
S.E.F. Torres 1903 players
Reggina 1914 players
A.S. Gubbio 1910 players
A.S.D. Città di Foligno 1928 players
Taranto F.C. 1927 players
S.S.D. Città di Campobasso players
S.S.D. Marsala Calcio players
S.S.D. F.C. Messina players
A.S.D. Atletico Terme Fiuggi players
Association football forwards